John Stanley Joseph Wojtowicz (March 9, 1945January 2, 2006) was an American bank robber whose story inspired the 1975 film Dog Day Afternoon.

Early life
Wojtowicz was the son of a Polish father and an Italian-American mother (nee Terry Basso). He served in the United States Army and was posted to Vietnam during the Vietnam War.

Personal life
Wojtowicz married Carmen Bifulco in 1967. They had two children and separated in 1969.

In 1971, Wojtowicz met Elizabeth Eden at the Feast of San Gennaro in New York City. The two had a public wedding ceremony that year.

Wojtowicz was at some point a member of the Gay Activists Alliance. He used at that time the alias "Littlejohn Basso" (Basso being his mother's maiden name).

Bank robbery
On August 22, 1972, Wojtowicz, along with Salvatore Naturile and Robert Westenberg, attempted to rob a branch of the Chase Manhattan Bank at 450 Avenue P in Gravesend, Brooklyn. The Los Angeles Times reported the heist was meant to pay for Eden's (male-to-female) sex reassignment surgery. However, Arthur Bell, a respected Village Voice columnist and investigative journalist who knew Wojtowicz (and was tangentially involved in the negotiations), reported that paying for Eden's surgery was only peripheral to the real motive. The attempted heist was, according to him, a well-planned Mafia operation that went horribly wrong.

Wojtowicz and Naturile held seven Chase Manhattan bank employees hostage for fourteen hours. Westenberg fled the scene before the robbery got underway after he saw a police car on the street. Wojtowicz, a former bank teller, had some knowledge of bank operations.

Naturile was killed by the FBI during the final moments of the incident; Wojtowicz was arrested.

Aftermath
According to Wojtowicz, he was offered a deal for pleading guilty, which the court did not honor, and on April 23, 1973, he was sentenced to 20 years in Lewisburg Federal Penitentiary, of which he served five.

Wojtowicz was released from prison on April 10, 1978, but was arrested again and served two more sentences in prison for parole violations in 1984 and from 1986–87. He was released in April 1987 and he said Eden visited him in New York about once a month.

Eden, who married someone else and then divorced, died of AIDS-related pneumonia at Genesee Hospital, in Rochester, New York, on September 29, 1987. Wojtowicz attended her funeral and delivered a eulogy.

Dog Day Afternoon

Wojtowicz's story was used as the basis for the film Dog Day Afternoon (released in 1975), starring Al Pacino as Wojtowicz (called "Sonny Wortzik" in the film) and John Cazale, one of Pacino's co-stars in The Godfather, as Naturile. Elizabeth Eden, known as "Leon" in the film, was portrayed by actor Chris Sarandon.

In 1975, Wojtowicz wrote a letter to The New York Times out of concern that people would believe the movie version of the events, which he said was only 30% accurate. Wojtowicz's main objection was the inaccurate portrayal of his wife Carmen Bifulco as a plain, overweight woman whose behavior led to his relationship with Eden, when in fact he had left Bifulco two years before he met Eden.

Other concerns he had that were fictionalized in the movie were that he never spoke to his mother and that the police refused to let him speak to his wife Carmen.  In addition, the movie insinuated that Wojtowicz had "sold out" Naturile to the police, and although Wojtowicz claimed this was untrue, several attempts were made on his life following an inmate screening of the movie.

Wojtowicz praised Pacino and Sarandon's characterizations of himself and Elizabeth Eden as accurate. In a 2006 interview, the movie's screenwriter, Frank Pierson, said that he tried to visit Wojtowicz in prison many times to get more details about his story when he wrote the screenplay, but Wojtowicz refused to see him because he felt he was not paid enough money for the rights to his story. Either way, the film was very successful, receiving good reviews and winning the Academy Award for Best Original Screenplay at the 1975 ceremony.

Later years and death
In 2001, The New York Times reported that Wojtowicz was living on welfare in Brooklyn.   He died of cancer on January 2, 2006, in his mother's home, aged 60.

Documentaries
Wojtowicz was the subject of multiple documentaries:

The Third Memory (1999), directed by artist Pierre Huyghe and first exhibited in a museum context at the Centre Georges Pompidou in Paris and The Renaissance Society in Chicago (in the format of a two-channel video), took Dog Day Afternoon as its starting point and depicts Wojtowicz recreating the events of bank robbery with actor look-a-likes and props on a reconstruction of the set of Lumet's film. Juxtaposed with footage from Dog Day Afternoon, it demonstrates that Wojtowicz's memory appears to have been irrevocably altered by the film about his life. For example, he speculated that President  Richard Nixon personally ordered the FBI killing of Salvatore because live news media coverage following the bank robbery that evening was cutting into the network television broadcast of Nixon's re-election acceptance speech at the 1972 Republican National Convention, at The Convention Center in Miami Beach.
Based on a True Story (2004)
The Dog (also known as Storyville: The Great Sex Addict Heist), 10 years in the making by directors Allison Berg and Frank Keraudren, premiered at the Toronto International Film Festival in September 2013.

References

Further reading

External links

 Federal Bureau of Prisons Inmate Locator – Search for John Stanley Wojtowicz or number 76456-158

1945 births
2006 deaths
American bank robbers
American people of Italian descent
American people of Polish descent
Bisexual men
Deaths from cancer in New York (state)
LGBT people from New York (state)
People from Manhattan
United States Army soldiers
United States Army personnel of the Vietnam War
20th-century LGBT people